Thure Emanuel Johansson (11 September 1912 – 12 March 1986) was a Swedish freestyle wrestler who won a bronze medal in the flyweight division at the 1948 Summer Olympics.

References

External links
 

1912 births
1986 deaths
Olympic wrestlers of Sweden
Wrestlers at the 1948 Summer Olympics
Swedish male sport wrestlers
Olympic bronze medalists for Sweden
Olympic medalists in wrestling
Medalists at the 1948 Summer Olympics
20th-century Swedish people